Amy Wilentz is an American journalist and writer. She is a professor of English at the University of California, Irvine, where she teaches in the Literary Journalism program. She received a 2013 National Book Critics Circle Award for her memoir, Farewell, Fred Voodoo: A Letter from Haiti, as well as a 2020 Guggenheim Fellowship in General Nonfiction. Wilentz was the Jerusalem correspondent for The New Yorker, and is a contributing editor at The Nation.

Early life and education
Wilentz was raised in Perth Amboy, New Jersey. She is the daughter of Robert Wilentz and Jacqueline Malino Wilentz. Her father was chief justice of the New Jersey Supreme Court from 1979 to 1996; her mother was a painter. She is the granddaughter of David T. Wilentz who was the attorney general of New Jersey from 1934 to 1944, best known for prosecuting Bruno Hauptmann in the Lindbergh kidnapping trial. She attended Harvard for undergraduate study in 1976, where she lived with roommate Jill Abramson in Mather House and wrote for The Harvard Crimson. She spent a year after graduation on a Harvard/Radcliffe fellowship at the Ecole Normale Supérieure in Paris, France.

Career
Wilentz's first jobs in journalism were for The Nation, Newsday, and Time. She also worked for Ben Sonnenberg's literary periodical Grand Street in its first years. She has followed events in Haiti for many years, from the fall of Jean-Claude Duvalier in 1986 through the 2010 earthquake and the death of Jean-Claude Duvalier in 2014.

Her works have appeared in The New York Times, the Los Angeles Times, Time, The New Republic, Mother Jones, Harper's, Vogue, Condé Nast Traveler, Travel & Leisure, San Francisco Chronicle, More, The Village Voice, The London Review of Books, and The Huffington Post.

Personal life
Wilentz is married to Nicholas Goldberg, opinion editor of the Los Angeles Times.

Awards
 1990 Whiting Award
 1990 PEN/Martha Albrand Award for First Nonfiction for The Rainy Season     
 2000 Rosenthal Award, American Academy of Arts and Letters for Martyrs' Crossing
 1989 National Book Critics Circle Award, General Nonfiction finalist
2013 National Book Critics Circle Award (Autobiography/Memoir), winner for Farewell, Fred Voodoo
2020 Guggenheim Fellowship in General Nonfiction

Works

Books

Anthologies
Robert Maguire and Scott Freeman, ed. (2017). Who Owns Haiti?: People, Power, and Sovereignty. Contributor Amy Wilentz. University Press of Florida. . 
The Nation's 150th Anniversary Special Issue (2015). Contributor Amy Wilentz: "The Future of a Failed State".
Jeff Sharlet, ed. (2014). Radiant Truths: Essential Dispatches, Reports, Confessions, and Other Essays on American Belief. Contributor Amy Wilentz. Yale University Press. .

References

External links
Author's website
Faculty page at UC Irvine
Profile at The Whiting Foundation
"Review: MARTYRS' CROSSING", Book Reporter

American women journalists
People from Perth Amboy, New Jersey
Radcliffe College alumni
University of California, Irvine faculty
Living people
1954 births
21st-century American women